Caobao Road is an interchange station between Line 1 and Line 12 of the Shanghai Metro. This station is part of the initial southern section of the line that opened on 28 May 1993 and is located in Xuhui District. The station became an interchange station with the arrival of Line 12 which entered operation on 19 December 2015. This station has been rumored to be haunted.

Station Layout

References 

Shanghai Metro stations in Xuhui District
Line 1, Shanghai Metro
Line 12, Shanghai Metro
Railway stations in China opened in 1993
Railway stations in Shanghai
Xuhui District